Luis Carlos Restrepo Ramírez (born 24 January 1954) is a Colombian psychiatrist and philosopher, who served as the 5th High Commissioner for Peace of Colombia from August 2002 to March 2009.

While in Office, he was in charge of the controversial demobilization and disarmament of 32,000 paramilitaries of the United Self-Defense Forces of Colombia and 13,000 guerrilla fighters.

For some time, the Government of Colombia considered him a fugitive, after the Supreme Court of Justice of Colombia issued an international arrest warrant after Restrepo left the country on 8 January 2012 on a flight bound to the United States; his current whereabouts remain unknown, but he is presumed to have obtained political asylum in Canada.
Restrepo, who was accused of faking the demobilization of a FARC military unit in 2006, is charged by the Office of the Attorney General of Colombia with conspiracy to commit crime; embezzlement; and arms possession, trafficking, and manufacturing. Restrepo, who was one of the closest allies of the President Álvaro Uribe Vélez, has denied the allegations made against him, and accused the Administration of President Juan Manuel Santos Calderón of mounting a political persecution against him; in this he receives the backing and support of former President Uribe. However, on September 23, 2013, Colombia's Prosecutor General dropped the arrest warrant against Restrepo.

From his exile, Restrepo has shown support for the current Peace talks of President Juan Manuel Santos with FARC rebels.

Personal life
Luis Carlos was born on 24 January 1954 in Filandia, Caldas Department to Carlos E. Restrepo Ramírez and Soledad Ramírez Ospina.

Works

References

1954 births
Living people
People from Quindío Department
National University of Colombia alumni
Pontifical Xavierian University alumni
Colombian psychiatrists
Colombian philosophers
Colombian male writers
Peace Commissioners of Colombia
Fugitives wanted by Colombia
Fugitives wanted on arms smuggling charges
Fugitives wanted on fraud charges